The LVG C.V was a reconnaissance aircraft produced in large numbers in Germany during World War I.

Design and development
The C.V was a conventional two-bay biplane design of its day, with unstaggered wings of equal span and tandem, open cockpits for the pilot and observer. The ailerons, fitted only to the upper wing, featured aerodynamic balances that extended past the wingtips. The fuselage was a semi-monocoque construction skinned in wood.

Following the war, some C.Vs were used as civil transports, while some 150 machines captured by Polish forces were put to use by the Polish army. Other post-war users included Russia, Latvia, Lithuania, and Estonia; together operating about 30 aircraft.

Operators
 
Luftstreitkrafte
 
Latvian Air Force - Postwar
 
Lithuanian Air Force - Postwar
 
Polish Air Force - used as a reconnaissance aircraft during Polish–Soviet War, then in postwar service
 
Imperial Russian Air Service - Postwar
 
Ottoman Air Force

Specifications

Notes

References

 

 
 

1910s German military reconnaissance aircraft
C.V
Single-engined tractor aircraft
Biplanes
Aircraft first flown in 1917

de:LVG C.V-VIII